Cylindera germanica is an extant species of tiger beetle in the genus Cylindera. Cylindera germanica is spread across most of Europe, ranging from Scandinavia to Central Europe to the Balkans. Four subspecies are recognized: Cylindera germanica germanica, Cylindera germanica michaelensis, Cylindera germanica muelleri, and Cylindera germanica sobrina.

Synonyms:
 Cicindela germanica Linnaeus, 1758

The nominate subspecies, C. g. germanica, has a large habitat, ranging across most of Europe and eastern Russia. However, it is not present in Greece, Corsica, Sicily and Turkey. Scientists are unsure whether this subspecies lives in Poland.

Gallery

References

germanica
Beetles described in 1758
Taxa named by Carl Linnaeus